Sir Thomas Salter Pyne  (1860–1921) was a British engineer based in Afghanistan.

Biography
He was born in Broseley, Shropshire, the son of John Pyne and Alice Salter. He was apprenticed to an engineer at the age of 15, becoming manager of a foundry and engineering works by 1879.

In 1883, he went out to India, where he worked for the merchant Thomas Acquin Martin for a few years. In 1887, when Martin was appointed Agent by Abdur Rahman Khan, the Amir of Afghanistan, he was sent by Martin to Kabul to be Chief Engineer of Afghanistan. There, as the first European to live in Afghanistan since the Second Anglo-Afghan War of 1879–81, he trained the local people to make guns, swords, ammunition, coins, soap, candles, etc. On behalf of Martin's firm, he built an arsenal, a mint and various factories and workshops,  employing in total some 4,000 workers.

In 1893, he was sent to India by the Amir as a Special Ambassador, and at the conclusion of the negotiations was invested a Companion of the Order of the Star of India (CSI) and knighted by the British government in recognition of his services. He was also a vital contact with the Durand Mission who were defining the borders of Afghanistan. He left the Amir's service in 1899 because of failing health and was replaced by Thomas Martin's younger brother Frank. He received a diamond inlaid watch from the Amir as a token of thanks.

He died in 1921. Sir Mortimer Durand said of him, "Pyne has gained a remarkable position in Afghanistan... The more I have to do with him, the more respect I feel for his sagacity."

References

External links

1860 births
1921 deaths
Companions of the Order of the Star of India
English engineers
People from Broseley
Knights Bachelor